"Melancolie" (English: "Melancholia") is a Soviet-Moldovan song written by Grigore Vieru.  The well known song was performed by various singers such as Sofia Rotaru,  Ion Suruceanu, and others.  Both Rotaru and Suruceanu appeared in the Soviet film Dnestrovskiye melodiy of the 1970s.

Lyrics

References

External links
 Melancolie at Sofia Rotaru website
 Lyrics

Sofia Rotaru songs
Romanian songs
Dance-pop songs
1983 songs